Henry Brockman may refer to:

Henry Brockman (Australian politician) (1845–1916)
Henry Brockman (colonist) (1647–1690), early settler of North America